There are about 380 known moth species of Somalia. The moths (mostly nocturnal) and butterflies (mostly diurnal) together make up the taxonomic order Lepidoptera.

This is a list of moth species which have been recorded in Somalia.

Arctiidae
Alpenus diversata (Hampson, 1916)
Alpenus investigatorum (Karsch, 1898)
Alpenus nigropunctata (Bethune-Baker, 1908)
Amata alicia (Butler, 1876)
Amata chrysozona (Hampson, 1898)
Amata romeii Berio, 1941
Amata velatipennis (Walker, 1864)
Amerila vitrea Plötz, 1880
Amsacta melanogastra (Holland, 1897)
Amsacta paolii Berio, 1936
Amsactarctia radiosa (Pagenstecher, 1903)
Amsactarctia venusta (Toulgoët, 1980)
Apisa canescens Walker, 1855
Argina amanda (Boisduval, 1847)
Argina astrea (Drury, 1773)
Automolis meteus (Stoll, 1781)
Estigmene griseata Hampson, 1916
Galtara somaliensis (Hampson, 1916)
Micralarctia tolgoeti Watson, 1988
Nanna eningae (Plötz, 1880)
Ochrota unicolor (Hopffer, 1857)
Paralacydes arborifera (Butler, 1875)
Paralacydes fiorii (Berio, 1937)
Paralacydes minorata (Berio, 1935)
Secusio discoidalis Talbot, 1929
Secusio strigata Walker, 1854
Spilosoma mediopunctata (Pagenstecher, 1903)
Spilosoma semihyalina Bartel, 1903
Teracotona rhodophaea (Walker, 1865)
Teracotona submacula (Walker, 1855)
Trichaeta fulvescens (Walker, 1854)
Trichaeta pterophorina (Mabille, 1892)
Utetheisa amhara Jordan, 1939
Utetheisa pulchella (Linnaeus, 1758)

Bombycidae
Ocinara ficicola (Westwood & Ormerod, 1889)

Cossidae
Aethalopteryx tristis (Gaede, 1915)
Nomima prophanes Durrant, 1916

Crambidae
Bocchoris inspersalis (Zeller, 1852)
Cnaphalocrocis trapezalis (Guenée, 1854)
Crocidolomia pavonana (Fabricius, 1794)
Herpetogramma mutualis (Zeller, 1852)
Hodebertia testalis (Fabricius, 1794)
Pyrausta phaenicealis (Hübner, 1818)

Gelechiidae
Pectinophora gossypiella (Saunders, 1844)

Geometridae
Acidaliastis subbrunnescens Prout, 1916
Aetheometra iconoclasis Prout, 1931
Antharmostes papilio Prout, 1912
Chiasmia calvifrons (Prout, 1916)
Chiasmia inconspicua (Warren, 1897)
Chiasmia semialbida (Prout, 1915)
Chiasmia subcurvaria (Mabille, 1897)
Cyclophora imperialis (Berio, 1937)
Hemidromodes subbrunnescens Prout, 1915
Isturgia deerraria (Walker, 1861)
Lomographa indularia (Guenée, 1858)
Pachypalpella subalbata (Warren, 1900)
Phaiogramma stibolepida (Butler, 1879)
Prasinocyma perpulverata Prout, 1916
Scopula africana Berio, 1937
Scopula minoa (Prout, 1916)
Scopula nepheloperas (Prout, 1916)
Scopula sagittilinea (Warren, 1897)
Sesquialtera ridicula Prout, 1916
Traminda acuta (Warren, 1897)
Traminda neptunaria (Guenée, 1858)
Tricentroscelis protrusifrons Prout, 1916
Zamarada mesotaenia Prout, 1931
Zamarada secutaria (Guenée, 1858)
Zamarada torrida D. S. Fletcher, 1974

Gracillariidae
Acrocercops bifasciata (Walsingham, 1891)

Lasiocampidae
Anadiasa colenettei Hartig, 1940
Anadiasa nicotrai Hartig, 1940
Anadiasa simplex Pagenstecher, 1903
Beralade fulvostriata Pagenstecher, 1903
Beralade sobrina (Druce, 1900)
Bombycopsis hyatti Tams, 1931
Chionopsyche grisea Aurivillius, 1914
Gonometa negrottoi Berio, 1940
Odontocheilopteryx myxa Wallengren, 1860
Odontocheilopteryx politzari Gurkovich & Zolotuhin, 2009
Odontopacha fenestrata Aurivillius, 1909
Sena donaldsoni (Holland, 1901)
Sena prompta (Walker, 1855)
Stenophatna marshalli Aurivillius, 1909
Stoermeriana abyssinicum (Aurivillius, 1908)
Stoermeriana collenettei Tams, 1931
Streblote finitorum Tams, 1931

Limacodidae
Coenobasis chloronoton Hampson, 1916
Coenobasis postflavida Hampson, 1910
Gavara caprai Berio, 1937
Gavara leucomera Hampson, 1916
Gavara velutina Walker, 1857
Latoia vivida (Walker, 1865)
Scotinochroa minor Hampson, 1916

Lymantriidae
Aclonophlebia inconspicua Hampson, 1910
Casama impura (Hering, 1926)
Casama vilis (Walker, 1865)
Cropera confalonierii Berio, 1937
Croperoides negrottoi Berio, 1940
Dasychira daphne Hering, 1926
Knappetra fasciata (Walker, 1855)
Laelia subrosea (Walker, 1855)
Rhypopteryx rhodea (Hampson, 1905

Metarbelidae
Metarbela erecta Gaede, 1929

Noctuidae
Acantholipes circumdata (Walker, 1858)
Achaea catella Guenée, 1852
Achaea lienardi (Boisduval, 1833)
Achaea mercatoria (Fabricius, 1775)
Acontia apatelia (Swinhoe, 1907)
Acontia basifera Walker, 1857
Acontia berioi Hacker, Legrain & Fibiger, 2008
Acontia caeruleopicta Hampson, 1916
Acontia caffraria (Cramer, 1777)
Acontia chiaromontei Berio, 1936
Acontia discoidea Hopffer, 1857
Acontia ectorrida (Hampson, 1916)
Acontia hortensis Swinhoe, 1884
Acontia imitatrix Wallengren, 1856
Acontia insocia (Walker, 1857)
Acontia lanzai (Berio, 1985)
Acontia mascheriniae (Berio, 1985)
Acontia miogona (Hampson, 1916)
Acontia notha Hacker, Legrain & Fibiger, 2010
Acontia nubila Hampson, 1910
Acontia opalinoides Guenée, 1852
Acontia pergratiosa Berio, 1937
Acontia porphyrea (Butler, 1898)
Acontia rigatoi Hacker, Legrain & Fibiger, 2008
Acontia semialba Hampson, 1910
Acontia somaliensis (Berio, 1977)
Acontia sublactea Hacker, Legrain & Fibiger, 2008
Acontia transfigurata Wallengren, 1856
Acontia trimaculata Aurivillius, 1879
Adisura bella Gaede, 1915
Aegleoides paolii Berio, 1937
Aegocera brevivitta Hampson, 1901
Aegocera rectilinea Boisduval, 1836
Agrotis bialbifasciata Berio, 1953
Agrotis negrottoi Berio, 1938
Agrotis nicotrai Berio, 1945
Agrotis pictifascia (Hampson, 1896)
Amazonides menieri Laporte, 1974
Amyna axis Guenée, 1852
Amyna punctum (Fabricius, 1794)
Androlymnia clavata Hampson, 1910
Anoba trigonosema (Hampson, 1916)
Anomis erosa (Hübner, 1818)
Anomis flava (Fabricius, 1775)
Anomis involuta Walker, 1857
Anomis mesogona (Walker, 1857)
Anomis sabulifera (Guenée, 1852)
Antarchaea digramma (Walker, 1863)
Antarchaea fragilis (Butler, 1875)
Anticarsia rubricans (Boisduval, 1833)
Ariathisa abyssinia (Guenée, 1852)
Asplenia melanodonta (Hampson, 1896)
Athetis discopuncta Hampson, 1916
Athetis satellitia (Hampson, 1902)
Audea melanoplaga Hampson, 1902
Beihania diascota (Hampson, 1916)
Brevipecten calimanii (Berio, 1939)
Brevipecten cornuta Hampson, 1902
Brevipecten discolora Hacker & Fibiger, 2007
Brevipecten marmoreata Hacker & Fibiger, 2007
Brevipecten tessenei Berio, 1939
Calesia zambesita Walker, 1865
Callhyccoda viriditrina Berio, 1935
Callopistria latreillei (Duponchel, 1827)
Callopistria yerburii Butler, 1884
Caranilla uvarovi (Wiltshire, 1949)
Catephia mesonephele Hampson, 1916
Cerocala albimacula Hampson, 1916
Cerocala grandirena Berio, 1954
Cerocala illustrata Holland, 1897
Cerocala munda Druce, 1900
Cerocala oppia (Druce, 1900)
Cetola vicina de Joannis, 1913
Chrysodeixis acuta (Walker, [1858])
Chrysodeixis chalcites (Esper, 1789)
Chrysodeixis eriosoma (Doubleday, 1843)
Clytie tropicalis Rungs, 1975
Condica capensis (Guenée, 1852)
Craterestra definiens (Walker, 1857)
Crionica cervicornis (Fawcett, 1917)
Ctenoplusia fracta (Walker, 1857)
Ctenusa curvilinea Hampson, 1913
Cyligramma fluctuosa (Drury, 1773)
Diparopsis castanea Hampson, 1902
Discestra quercii Berio, 1941
Donuctenusa fiorii Berio, 1940
Dysgonia algira (Linnaeus, 1767)
Dysgonia torrida (Guenée, 1852)
Ecthymia lemonia Berio, 1940
Epharmottomena sublimbata Berio, 1894
Erebus macrops (Linnaeus, 1767)
Ethiopica hesperonota Hampson, 1909
Ethiopica ignecolora Hampson, 1916
Ethiopica phaeocausta Hampson, 1916
Eublemma daphoenoides Berio, 1941
Eublemma exigua (Walker, 1858)
Eublemma galacteoides Berio, 1937
Eublemma olmii Berio, 1937
Eublemma postrosea Gaede, 1935
Eublemma reninigra Berio, 1945
Eublemma rivula (Moore, 1882)
Eublemma scitula (Rambur, 1833)
Eudocima materna (Linnaeus, 1767)
Eulocastra tamsi Berio, 1938
Eustrotia decissima (Walker, 1865)
Eustrotia extranea Berio, 1937
Eutelia discitriga Walker, 1865
Eutelia grisescens Hampson, 1916
Giubicolanta orientalis Berio, 1937
Grammodes exclusiva Pagenstecher, 1907
Grammodes stolida (Fabricius, 1775)
Hadjina plumbeogrisea (Hampson, 1916)
Helicoverpa zea (Boddie, 1850)
Heliothis nubigera Herrich-Schäffer, 1851
Hemituerta mahdi (Pagenstecher, 1903)
Heraclia thruppi (Butler, 1886)
Heteropalpia robusta Wiltshire, 1988
Heteropalpia vetusta (Walker, 1865)
Hypena abyssinialis Guenée, 1854
Hypena lividalis (Hübner, 1790)
Hypena obacerralis Walker, [1859]
Hypena obsitalis (Hübner, [1813])
Hypotacha bubo Berio, 1941
Hypotacha indecisa Walker, [1858]
Hypotacha retracta (Hampson, 1902)
Janseodes melanospila (Guenée, 1852)
Leucania inangulata (Gaede, 1935)
Leucania loreyi (Duponchel, 1827)
Leucania melanostrota (Hampson, 1905)
Leucania negrottoi (Berio, 1940)
Leucania patrizii (Berio, 1935)
Lophotavia incivilis Walker, 1865
Lyncestoides unilinea (Swinhoe, 1885)
Masalia fissifascia (Hampson, 1903)
Masalia leucosticta (Hampson, 1902)
Masalia perstriata (Hampson, 1903)
Matopo descarpentriesi (Laporte, 1975)
Mentaxya muscosa Geyer, 1837
Microraphe fiorii Berio, 1937
Mimasura innotata Hampson, 1910
Mimasura pseudopyralis Berio, 1937
Mimasura unipuncta (Hampson, 1902)
Mitrophrys menete (Cramer, 1775)
Odontoretha featheri Hampson, 1916
Oedicodia melanographa Hampson, 1916
Oedicodia strigipennis Hampson, 1916
Ophiusa tirhaca (Cramer, 1777)
Oraesia intrusa (Krüger, 1939)
Oraesia provocans Walker, [1858]
Ozarba albimarginata (Hampson, 1896)
Ozarba albomediovittata Berio, 1937
Ozarba aloisiisabaudiae Berio, 1937
Ozarba boursini Berio, 1940
Ozarba deficiens Berio, 1935
Ozarba endoplaga Hampson, 1916
Ozarba endoscota Hampson, 1916
Ozarba negrottoi Berio, 1940
Ozarba nicotrai Berio, 1950
Ozarba parvula Berio, 1940
Ozarba pluristriata (Berio, 1937)
Ozarba scorpio Berio, 1935
Ozarba semiluctuosa Berio, 1937
Ozarba semitorrida Hampson, 1916
Pericyma mendax (Walker, 1858)
Pericyma metaleuca Hampson, 1913
Pericyma umbrina (Guenée, 1852)
Phytometra pentheus Fawcett, 1916
Plecoptera reflexa Guenée, 1852
Plecopterodes clytie Gaede, 1936
Polydesma scriptilis Guenée, 1852
Pseudozarba bipartita (Herrich-Schäffer, 1950)
Pseudozarba mianoides (Hampson, 1893)
Pseudozarba opella (Swinhoe, 1885)
Rabila albiviridis (Hampson, 1916)
Radara subcupralis (Walker, [1866])
Rhesala moestalis (Walker, 1866)
Rhynchina albiscripta Hampson, 1916
Sesamia cretica Lederer, 1857
Speia vuteria (Stoll, 1790)
Sphingomorpha chlorea (Cramer, 1777)
Spodoptera cilium Guenée, 1852
Spodoptera exempta (Walker, 1857)
Spodoptera exigua (Hübner, 1808)
Spodoptera littoralis (Boisduval, 1833)
Spodoptera mauritia (Boisduval, 1833)
Teucocranon microcallia Berio, 1937
Thermesia incedens (Walker, 1858)
Thiacidas acronictoides (Berio, 1950)
Thiacidas cerurodes (Hampson, 1916)
Thiacidas fasciata (Fawcett, 1917)
Thiacidas roseotincta (Pinhey, 1962)
Thiacidas somaliensis Hacker & Zilli, 2010
Thiacidas triangulata (Gaede, 1939)
Trichoplusia ni (Hübner, [1803])
Trichoplusia orichalcea (Fabricius, 1775)
Trigonodes exportata Guenée, 1852
Trigonodes hyppasia (Cramer, 1779)
Tuerta pastocyana Berio, 1940
Tytroca leucoptera (Hampson, 1896)
Ulotrichopus primulina (Hampson, 1902)
Ulotrichopus tinctipennis (Hampson, 1902)
Xanthomera leucoglene (Mabille, 1880)
Zethesides bettoni (Butler, 1898)

Nolidae
Arcyophora longivalvis Guenée, 1852
Bryophilopsis tarachoides Mabille, 1900
Earias insulana (Boisduval, 1833)
Leocyma candace Fawcett, 1916
Leocyma discophora Hampson, 1912
Maurilia arcuata (Walker, [1858])
Nola doggeensis Strand, 1920

Notodontidae
Antheua grisea (Gaede, 1928)
Phalera imitata Druce, 1896
Scrancia discomma Jordan, 1916
Simesia balachowskyi Kiriakoff, 1973
Simesia olmii (Berio, 1937)

Plutellidae
Paraxenistis africana Mey, 2007

Psychidae
Melasina psephota Durrant, 1916
Melasina recondita Durrant, 1916

Pterophoridae
Agdistis arabica Amsel, 1958
Arcoptilia gizan Arenberger, 1985
Deuterocopus socotranus Rebel, 1907
Megalorhipida leucodactylus (Fabricius, 1794)

Saturniidae
Bunaeopsis oubie (Guérin-Méneville, 1849)
Gynanisa maja (Klug, 1836)
Ludia arguta Jordan, 1922
Ludia hansali Felder, 1874
Ludia jordani Bouyer, 1997
Melanocera menippe (Westwood, 1849)
Orthogonioptilum ianthinum Rougeot, 1959
Yatanga smithi (Holland, 1892)

Sesiidae
Echidgnathia vitrifasciata (Hampson, 1910)
Melittia pyropis Hampson, 1919
Melittia ursipes Walker, 1856

Sphingidae
Acherontia atropos (Linnaeus, 1758)
Agrius convolvuli (Linnaeus, 1758)
Cephonodes hylas (Linnaeus, 1771)
Ellenbeckia monospila Rothschild & Jordan, 1903
Hippotion celerio (Linnaeus, 1758)
Hippotion moorei Jordan, 1926
Hippotion pentagramma (Hampson, 1910)
Hippotion rebeli Rothschild & Jordan, 1903
Hippotion rosae (Butler, 1882)
Hippotion socotrensis (Rebel, 1899)
Hippotion stigma (Rothschild & Jordan, 1903)
Leucostrophus alterhirundo d'Abrera, 1987
Likoma crenata Rothschild & Jordan, 1907
Microclanis erlangeri (Rothschild & Jordan, 1903)
Nephele argentifera (Walker, 1856)
Nephele funebris (Fabricius, 1793)
Nephele xylina Rothschild & Jordan, 1910
Poliana micra Rothschild & Jordan, 1903
Poliodes roseicornis Rothschild & Jordan, 1903
Polyptychoides grayii (Walker, 1856)
Polyptychoides niloticus (Jordan, 1921)
Praedora marshalli Rothschild & Jordan, 1903
Pseudoclanis postica (Walker, 1856)
Rufoclanis erlangeri (Rothschild & Jordan, 1903)

Thyrididae
Kuja hamatypex (Hampson, 1916)

Tineidae
Phthoropoea halogramma (Meyrick, 1927)
Trichophaga abruptella (Wollaston, 1858)

Tortricidae
Ancylis spinicola Meyrick, 1927
Eucosma somalica Durrant, 1916

Xyloryctidae
Eretmocera fasciata Walsingham, 1896

Zygaenidae
Epiorna abessynica (Koch, 1865)
Saliunca homochroa (Holland, 1897)

References

External links 

Moths
Moths
Somalia
Somalia